Alan Simon may refer to:

 Alan Simon (EastEnders), fictional soap opera character
 Alan Simon (musician) (born 1964), French folk rock musician and composer